Cecil Chao Sze-Tsung (born 1936) is a Hong Kong billionaire who is the owner of Cheuk Nang (Holdings) Ltd.

Chao is the last surviving of the four sons of Wuxi-born shipping tycoon Chao Tsong-yea and his wife Chao Nyi Ya-tsung. His elder brother Frank Chao Sze-bang died in 2001, and his younger brother George Chao Sze-kwong died in 2016.

He claims to have dated with over 10,000 women. He has three children by three of them: Wai Yiu (mother of Gigi Chao), Ying Ying (mother of Howard), and Terri Holladay (mother of Roman).

In 2012, Chao gained international attention when he offered $65 million to any man who could convince his lesbian daughter, Gigi Chao, to marry him. Despite criticism, Cecil Chao remains unrepentant. In 2014 Chao increased the reward to $180 million. Gigi responded publicly in an open letter printed in the South China Morning Post.

References

1936 births
Living people
Hong Kong billionaires
Hong Kong chief executives
Alumni of Durham University
Hong Kong financial businesspeople
Billionaires from Shanghai
Businesspeople from Shanghai
Chinese company founders